Contrafuerte River is a river in the Los Ríos Region of Chile. The river flows north from the northern slopes of Puyehue-Cordón Caulle following Liquiñe-Ofqui Fault. It flows into Nilahue River.

References

Rivers of Los Ríos Region
Rivers of Chile